In mathematics, biquandles and biracks are sets with binary operations that generalize quandles and racks. Biquandles take, in the theory of virtual knots, the place that quandles occupy in the theory of classical knots. Biracks and racks have the same relation, while a biquandle is a birack which satisfies some additional conditions.

Definitions

These satisfy the following three axioms:

1.  

2.  

3.  

These identities appeared in 1992 in reference [FRS] where the object was called a species.

The superscript and subscript notation is useful here because it dispenses with the need for brackets. For example,
three axioms above become

1. 

2. 

3. 

If in addition the two operations are invertible, that is given  in the set  there are unique  in the set  such that  and  then the set  together with the two operations define a birack.

For example, if , with the operation , is a rack then it is a birack if we define the other operation to be the identity,  .

For a birack the function  can be defined by

 

Then

1.  is a bijection

2. 

This condition is sometimes known as the set-theoretic Yang-Baxter equation.

To see that 1. is true note that  defined by

 

is the inverse to

To see that 2. is true let us follow the progress of the triple  under . So

 

On the other hand, . Its progress under  is

 

Any  satisfying 1. 2. is said to be a switch (precursor of biquandles and biracks).

Examples of switches are the identity, the twist  and  where  is the operation of a rack.

A switch will define a birack if the operations are invertible. Note that the identity switch does not do this.

Biquandles
A biquandle is a birack which satisfies some additional structure, as described by Nelson and Rische. The axioms of a biquandle are "minimal" in the sense that they are the weakest restrictions that can be placed on the two binary operations while making the biquandle of a virtual knot invariant under Reidemeister moves.

Linear biquandles

Application to virtual links and braids

Birack homology

Further reading
 [FJK] Roger Fenn, Mercedes Jordan-Santana, Louis Kauffman Biquandles and Virtual Links, Topology and its Applications, 145 (2004) 157–175
 [FRS] Roger Fenn, Colin Rourke, Brian Sanderson An Introduction to Species and the Rack Space in Topics in Knot Theory (1992), Kluwer 33–55
 [K] L. H. Kauffman, Virtual Knot Theory, European Journal of Combinatorics 20 (1999), 663–690.

Knot theory
Algebraic structures
Ordered algebraic structures
Non-associative algebra